Speckled trout may refer to:

 Brook trout (Salvelinus fontinalis), a freshwater fish in the family Salmonidae
 Cynoscion nebulosus, also called spotted seatrout, a coastal saltwater or brackish water fish in the family Sciaenidae (drums)
 The modified C-135 Stratolifter used by the United States Air Force Chief of Staff